Stephan Morais (Stephan Godinho Lopes de Moraes, born October 27, 1973 in London, England) is a Portuguese British investor. 

Morais is an engineer by training, having graduated from Instituto Superior Técnico in 1996 with a Civil Engineering degree. Departing from his field of study, he completed an MBA focusing in Private Equity and Venture Capital at Harvard Business School and went on to pursue a career in management, consulting, banking and investment.

In 2019, he co-founded Indico Capital Partners, Portugal’s leading venture capital firm, of which he is the Managing General Partner. He is the President of the Harvard Club of Portugal.

Early life and education
Morais, the son of Portuguese lawyers, was born in London, England, and raised in Lisbon, Portugal, where he attended two of the top rated schools in the country: Colégio Sagrado Coração de Maria and Colégio Valsassina. 

A Civil Engineer, Morais graduated in 1996 from Portugal's largest engineering university, the Instituto Superior Técnico - University of Lisbon in Lisbon, having spent the last semester at the École Nationale des Ponts et Chaussées in Paris, France. In 2000 he was accepted for the MBA program of Harvard Business School. He graduated in 2002, specialising in private equity and venture capital and being awarded a Sainsbury Management Fellowship.

Career 
Early Career

Morais initiated his career at the Halcrow Group Limited in the UK, working in privatization projects on behalf of multilateral agencies in Mozambique, Pakistan, Panama and Chile. He later moved permanently to London, joining Arthur Andersen Business Consulting, to integrate the Energy and Utilities team as a Senior Consultant. He co-founded a London-based startup during the dotcom boom focusing on water trading, the Waterexchange.

Upon completing his MBA, Morais was appointed as consultant to the Portuguese Government for the privatization of a main State investing conglomerate, IPE, and for the draft of the country's National Energy policy. Morais joined Energias de Portugal in 2003 as chief of staff of the CEO and was subsequently appointed managing director of the Bilbao-based Naturgas Energia Servicios.

Having specialized in private equity investments while attending Harvard, Morais was invited to invest in, and lead as CEO, Temahome, a major Portuguese furniture design and manufacturing company, with a group of other Portuguese investors and the company's management team, in 2006. He left the company at the end of 2009. A year later, Morais was the first Portuguese person to be named a Young Global Leader by the World Economic Forum.

Investment Career

In 2010, Stephan Morais joined Portugal's largest bank, Grupo Caixa Geral de Depósitos, where he was appointed as board member and deputy CEO of a new African investment bank based in Mozambique, BNI - Banco Nacional de Investimento, a partnership between Portuguese Caixa and the Mozambican government. He also served as executive director of Caixa Capital, one of the largest and most international private equity and venture capital operators in Iberia, managing over 90 billion Euros in funds.

While at Caixa, Morais led investments in most major Portuguese and global startups, such as Farfetch, Unbabel, Uniplaces, D-Orbit, amongst others, that raised significant capital in Silicon Valley and London. Through this work, he became Portugal’s most notorious and successful Venture Capitalist.  

Morais has worked as a non-executive director at Crimson Investment Management, and is a former Venture Capital Council Member at Invest Europe, Council Member of the International Venture Club, Chairman of the European Venture Finance Network and a jury at numerous entrepreneurship and investment awards.

Indico Capital Partners

In 2017, Morais left Caixa to co-found his own independent investment fund, Indico Capital Partners, alongside Caixa colleague Ricardo Torgal, and Talkdesk co-founder Cristina Fonseca. Indico is an Iberia focused, industry agnostic, multi stage fund, albeit with a focus on early stage to Series A. 

In 2020, Indico was chosen by Google for Startups as the partner fund for their accelerator program, which was launched in the same year and is now on its 3rd edition. In 2022, a climate-action strategy was launched with the Indico Blue Fund, that backs Blue Economy sustainable startups and SMEs based in Portugal. 

Since 2019, Indico has invested 35 million euros in 30 companies, including Tier, Anchorage Digital and Remote, which have raised more than 1.5 billion euros from global investors, making it the leading independent venture capital fund in Portugal.

Morais is currently the Managing General Partner at Indico Capital Partners.

Awards
2002 Sainsbury Management Fellowship
2009 DME Award - Design management Europe
2009 National Design Award - "Sena da Silva" Presented by the Portuguese Design Center and the President of the Portuguese Republic
2010 Nominated Young Global Leader by the World Economic Forum

References

External links
 Young Global Leaders - Profile at The World Economic Forum
  - official Twitter page

1973 births
Harvard Business School alumni
Living people
Portuguese engineers
Portuguese chief executives
20th-century Portuguese businesspeople
21st-century Portuguese businesspeople
Instituto Superior Técnico alumni
English people of Portuguese descent